Sulejman Pasha Bargjini (also known in) was an ethnic Albanian general, nobleman and Governor of the Ottoman Empire. He was originally from Bargjin, but he settled in the village of Mullet, Albania and probably served as a Janissary, he was given the title Pasha. As an ethnic Albanian, he had fought for the Ottomans against the Safavids in Persia. After that he had built a mosque (the Sylejman Pasha Mosque), a bakery and a hammam (Islamic sauna). He founded the settlement of Tirana, now the capital of Albania, in 1614 as an oriental-style town of those times. According to some local legends, he named the town he founded after Tehran, the capital of Persia (nowadays Iran). This, however, is a folk etymology without basis in fact, as Tirana was already mentioned in Venetian documents as early as 1418.

With Sulejman's foundations, Tirana soon became the center of Albanian art, culture and religion (especially with the Spread of Islam and the Bektashi Sufism), it became famous because of its strategic position at the heart of Albania.

His resting place, the Suleyman Pasha Tomb, got destroyed by the Communist government. A statue of Sulejman Pasha stands in the square named after him in downtown Tirana. A small street in another part of Tirana also bears his name.

See also 
 Molla Bey of Petrela
 Etëhem Bey Mollaj

References 

Albanian Muslims
Albanian Pashas
Muslims from the Ottoman Empire
Ottoman Army personnel
Year of birth unknown
Year of death unknown
People from Tirana
City founders
16th-century Albanian people
17th-century Albanian people